In mathematics, the Euler–Maclaurin formula is a formula for the difference between an integral and a closely related sum.  It can be used to approximate integrals by finite sums, or conversely to evaluate finite sums and infinite series using integrals and the machinery of calculus. For example, many asymptotic expansions are derived from the formula, and Faulhaber's formula for the sum of powers is an immediate consequence.

The formula was discovered independently by Leonhard Euler and Colin Maclaurin around 1735.  Euler needed it to compute slowly converging infinite series while Maclaurin used it to calculate integrals.  It was later generalized to Darboux's formula.

The formula

can be approximated by the sum (or vice versa)

(see rectangle method).

Explicitly, for  a positive integer and a function  that is  times continuously differentiable on the interval , we have

In this case we have

or alternatively

The remainder term

The remainder term arises because the integral is usually not exactly equal to the sum. The boundary terms in these integrations lead to the main terms of the formula, and the leftover integrals form the remainder term.

The remainder term has an exact expression in terms of the periodized Bernoulli functions .

The periodized Bernoulli functions are defined as

With this notation, the remainder term  equals

When , it can be shown that

where   denotes the Riemann zeta function; one approach to prove this inequality is to obtain the Fourier series for the polynomials . The bound is achieved for even  when  is zero.  The term  may be omitted for odd  but the proof in this case is more complex (see Lehmer). Using this inequality, the size of the remainder term can be estimated as

Low-order cases

Therefore the low-order cases of the Euler–Maclaurin formula are:

Applications

The Basel problem
The Basel problem is to determine the sum

Euler computed this sum to 20 decimal places with only a few terms of the Euler–Maclaurin formula in 1735. This probably convinced him that the sum equals , which he proved in the same year.

Sums involving a polynomial

For instance, if , we can choose  to obtain, after simplification,

Approximation of integrals
The formula provides a means of approximating a finite integral. Let  be the endpoints of the interval of integration. Then:

This may be viewed as an extension of the trapezoid rule by the inclusion of correction terms. Thus, the remainder term generally demands close attention.

The Euler–Maclaurin formula is also used for detailed error analysis in numerical quadrature. It explains the superior performance of the trapezoidal rule on smooth periodic functions and is used in certain extrapolation methods. Clenshaw–Curtis quadrature is essentially a change of variables to cast an arbitrary integral in terms of integrals of periodic functions where the Euler–Maclaurin approach is very accurate (in that particular case the Euler–Maclaurin formula takes the form of a discrete cosine transform). This technique is known as a periodizing transformation.

Asymptotic expansion of sums
In the context of computing asymptotic expansions of sums and series, usually the most useful form of the Euler–Maclaurin formula is

In many cases the integral on the right-hand side can be evaluated in closed form in terms of elementary functions even though the sum on the left-hand side cannot. Then all the terms in the asymptotic series can be expressed in terms of elementary functions. For example,

the gamma function  is equal to  when  is a positive integer. That expansion, in turn, serves as the starting point for one of the derivations of precise error estimates for Stirling's approximation of the factorial function.

Examples
If  is an integer greater than 1 we have:

Collecting the constants into a value of the Riemann zeta function, we can write an asymptotic expansion:

For  equal to 2 this simplifies to

or

When , the corresponding technique gives an asymptotic expansion for the harmonic numbers:

where  is the Euler–Mascheroni constant.

Proofs

Derivation by mathematical induction 
We outline the argument given in Apostol.

The first several Bernoulli polynomials are

The values  are the Bernoulli numbers .  Notice that for  we have

The functions  agree with the Bernoulli polynomials on the interval   and are periodic with period 1.  Furthermore, except when , they are also continuous. Thus,

Let  be an integer, and consider the integral

where

Integrating by parts, we get

Adding  to both sides and rearranging, we have

This is the  case of the summation formula.  To continue the induction, we apply integration by parts to the error term:

where

The result of integrating by parts is

This process can be iterated.  In this way we get a proof of the Euler–Maclaurin summation formula which can be formalized by mathematical induction, in which the induction step relies on integration by parts and on identities for periodic Bernoulli functions.

See also
 Cesàro summation
 Euler summation
 Gauss–Kronrod quadrature formula
 Darboux's formula
 Euler–Boole summation

References

Further reading

External links
 

Asymptotic analysis
Hilbert space
Numerical integration (quadrature)
Articles containing proofs
Theorems in analysis
Summability methods
Leonhard Euler